Hampton-Kings was a provincial electoral district for the Legislative Assembly of New Brunswick, Canada.  It was established in the 1994 electoral redistribution, in 2006 its boundaries were changed as its population was above the allowable reasonable population and its name was changed from Hampton-Belleisle to Hampton-Kings.

Members of the Legislative Assembly

Election results

Hampton-Kings

Hampton-Belleisle

References

External links 
Website of the Legislative Assembly of New Brunswick

Hampton, New Brunswick
New Brunswick provincial electoral districts